The Indian indenture system was a system of indentured servitude, by which more than one million Indians were transported to labour in European colonies, as a substitute for slave labor, following the abolition of the trade in the early 19th century. The system expanded after the abolition of slavery in the British Empire in 1833, in the French colonies in 1848, and in the Dutch Empire in 1863. British Indian indentureship lasted till the 1920s. This resulted in the development of a large Indian diaspora in the Caribbean, Natal (South Africa), East Africa, Réunion, Mauritius, Sri Lanka, Malaysia, Myanmar, British Guyana, to Fiji, as well as the growth of Indo-Caribbean, Indo-African, Indo-Fijian, Indo-Malaysian, Indo-Guyanese and Indo-Singaporean populations.

First indenture 

On 18 January 1826, the Government of the French Indian Ocean island of Réunion laid down terms for the introduction of Indian labourers to the colony. Each man was required to appear before a magistrate and declare that he was going voluntarily. This agreement is known as girmit and it outlined a period of five years labour in the colonies with pay of 8 Rupees per month (about $4 in 1826) and rations, provided labourers had been transported from Pondicherry and Karaikal.

The first attempt at importing Indian labour into Mauritius, in 1829, ended in failure, but by 1838, 25,000 Indian labourers had been shipped to Mauritius.

The Indian indenture system was put in place initially at the behest of sugar planters in colonial territories, who hoped the system would provide reliable cheap labour similar to the conditions under slavery. The new system was expected to demonstrate the superiority of "free" over slave labour in the production of tropical products for imperial markets.

Government of British India regulations 

The East India Company's Regulations of 1837 laid down specific conditions for the dispatch of Indian labour from Calcutta. The would-be emigrant and his emigration agent were required to appear before an officer designated by the Government of British India, with a written statement of the terms of the contract. The length of service was to be five years, renewable for further five-year terms. The emigrant was to be returned at the end of his service to the port of departure. Each emigrant vessel was required to conform to certain standards of space, diet etc. and to carry a medical officer. In 1837 this scheme was extended to Madras.

Ban on export of Indian labour 

As soon as the new system of emigration of labour became known, a campaign similar to the anti-slavery campaign sprang up in Britain and India. On 1 August 1838, a committee was appointed to inquire into the export of Indian labour. It heard reports of abuses of the new system. On 29 May 1839, overseas manual labour was prohibited and any person effecting such emigration was liable to a 200 Rupee fine or three months in jail. After prohibition, a few Indian labourers continued to be sent Mauritius via Pondicherry (a French enclave in South India).
However, immigration was authorised again in 1842 to Mauritius, and in 1845 to the West Indies.

Further suspensions of Indian immigration happened during the 19th century. For example, between 1848 and 1851 Indian immigration was stopped towards British Guiana because of the economic and political unrest due to the Sugar Duties Act of 1846.

Resumption of Indian labour transportation 

European planters in Mauritius and the Caribbean worked hard to overturn the ban, while the anti-slavery committee worked just as hard to uphold it. The Government of the East India Company finally capitulated under intense pressure from European planters and their supporters: On 2 December 1842, the British Government permitted emigration from Calcutta, Bombay, and Madras to Mauritius. Emigration Agents were appointed at each departure point. There were penalties for abuse of the system. Return passage had to be provided at any time after five years when claimed. After the lifting of the ban, the first ship left Calcutta for Mauritius on 23 January 1843. The Protector of the Immigrants in Mauritius reported that a ship arrived every few days with a human consignment and a large number of immigrants were causing a backlog in processing and he asked for help. During 1843, 30,218 male and 4,307 female indentured immigrants entered Mauritius. The first ship from Madras arrived in Mauritius on 21 April 1843.

Attempts to stamp out abuses of the system 

The existing regulations failed to stamp out abuses of the system, which continued, including recruitment by false pretences and consequently, in 1843 the Government of Bengal, was forced to restrict emigration from Calcutta, only permitting departure after the signing of a certificate from the Agent and countersigned by the Protector. Migration to Mauritius continued, with 9,709 male Coolies (Dhangars), and 1,840 female wives and daughters transported in 1844.
 
The repatriation of Indians who had completed indenture remained a problem with a high death rate and investigations revealed that regulations for the return voyages were not being satisfactorily followed.

Without enough recruits from Calcutta to satisfy the demands of European planters in Mauritius, permission was granted in 1847 to reopen emigration from Madras with the first ship leaving Madras for Mauritius in 1850.

There were also Company officials stationed in colonies that hosted Indian immigrants. For example, when the Danish plantation owners began recruiting Indians, the British representative - also considered a consul - to the Danish West Indies was called the Protector of Immigrants. This official oversaw the welfare of the workers and ensured that the terms of the agreement they signed were implemented.

Indian labour transportation to the Caribbean 

After the end of slavery, the European-led West Indian sugar colonies tried the use of emancipated slaves, families from Ireland, Germany and Malta and Portuguese from Madeira. All these efforts failed to satisfy the labour needs of the colonies due to high mortality of the new arrivals and their reluctance to continue working at the end of their indenture. On 16 November 1844, the British Indian Government legalised emigration to Jamaica, Trinidad and Demerara (Guyana). The first ship, the Whitby, sailed from Port Calcutta for British Guiana on 13 January 1838, and arrived in Berbice on 5 May 1838. Transportation to the Caribbean stopped in 1848 due to problems in the sugar industry and resumed in Demerara and Trinidad in 1851 and Jamaica in 1860.

Importing indentured labour became viable for plantation owners because newly emancipated slaves refused to work for low wages. This is demonstrated in the sheer number of freed slaves in colonies that imported Indian workers. Jamaica had 322,000 while British Guiana and Barbados had about 90,000 and 82,000 freed slaves, respectively. There was also a political incentive to the British import of foreign workers. The influx of Indian workers diminished the competitive leverage and bargaining power of the freed slaves, marginalizing their position within the so-called plantocracy system persisting in the British colonies.

Persuading labourers to prolong their indenture

Renouncing claim to free passage 
The European planters pressed consistently for longer indentures. In an effort to persuade labourers to stay on, the Mauritius Government, in 1847, offered a gratuity of £2 to each labourer who decided to remain in Mauritius and renounce his claim to a free passage. The Mauritius Government also wanted to discontinue the return passage and finally on 3 August 1852, the Government of British India agreed to change the conditions whereby if a passage was not claimed within six months of entitlement, it would be forfeited, but with safeguards for the sick and poor. A further change in 1852 stipulated that labourers could return after five years (contributing $35 towards the return passage) but would qualify for a free return passage after 10 years. This had a negative effect on recruitment as few wanted to sign up for 10 years and a sum of $35 was prohibitive; the change was discontinued after 1858.

Increasing proportion of women 
It was also considered that if the indentured labourers had a family life in the colonies they would be more likely to stay on. The proportion of women in early migration to Mauritius was small and the first effort to correct this imbalance was when, on 18 March 1856, the Secretary for the Colonies sent a dispatch to the Governor of Demerara that stated that for the season 1856–7 women must form 25 percent of the total and in the following years males must not exceed three times the number of females dispatched. It was more difficult to induce women from North India to go overseas than those from South India but the Colonial Office persisted and on 30 July 1868 instructions were issued that the proportion of 40 women to 100 men should be adhered to. It remained in force of the rest of the indenture period.

Land grants 
Trinidad followed a different trend where the Government offered the labourers a stake in the colony by providing real inducements to settle when their indentures had expired. From 1851 £10 was paid to all those who forfeited their return passages. Furthermore, Trinidad adopted an ordinance in 1870 by which new immigrants were not allotted to plantations where the death rate exceeded 7 percent.

Recruitment for other European colonies 
The success of the Indian indenture system for the British, at a terrible human cost, did not remain unnoticed. Other European plantation owners began setting up agents in India to recruit manpower. For instance, French sugar colonies hired labour via the French ports in India without knowledge of the British authorities. By 1856, the number of labourers in Réunion is estimated to have reached 37,694. It was not until 25 July 1860 that France was officially permitted by the British authorities to recruit labour for Reunion at a rate of 6,000 annually. This was extended on 1 July 1861 with permission to import ‘free’ labourers into the French colonies of Martinique, Guadeloupe and French Guiana (Cayenne). Indenture was for a period of five years (longer than British colonies at the time), return passage was provided at the end of indenture. (Not after ten as in British colonies) and Governor-General was empowered to suspend emigration to any French colony if any abuse was detected in the system.

Danish plantation owners also began importing Indian workers to St. Croix. This indenture system, however, did not last.

Transportation to other parts of the British Empire

Following introduction of labour laws acceptable to the British Government of India, transportation was extended to the smaller British Caribbean islands; Grenada in 1856, St Lucia in 1858 and St Kitts and St Vincent in 1860. Emigration to Natal was approved on 7 August 1860, and the first ship from Madras arrived in Durban on 16 November 1860, forming the basis of the Indian South African community. The recruits were employed on three-year contracts. The British Government permitted transportation to the Danish colonies in 1862. There was a high mortality rate in the one ship load sent to St Croix, and following adverse reports from the British Consul on the treatment of indentured labourers, further emigration was stopped. The survivors returned to India in 1868, leaving about eighty Indians behind. Permission was granted for emigration to Queensland in 1864, but no Indians were transported under the indenture system to this part of Australia.

Streamlining the indentured labour system of British India 

There were a lot of discrepancies between systems used for indentured Colonial British Indian labour to various colonies. Colonial British Government regulations of 1864 made general provisions for recruitment of Indian labour in an attempt to minimise abuse of the system. These included the appearance of the recruit before a magistrate in the district of recruitment and not the port of embarkation, licensing of recruiters and penalties to recruiters for not observing rules for recruitment, legally defined rules for the Protector of Emigrants, rules for the depots, payment for agents to be by salary and not commission, the treatment of emigrants on board ships and the proportion of females to males were set uniformly to 25 females to 100 males. Despite this the sugar colonies were able to devise labour laws that were disadvantageous to the immigrants. For example, in Demerara an ordinance in 1864 made it a crime for a labourer to be absent from work, misbehaving or not completing five tasks each week. New labour laws in Mauritius in 1867 made it impossible for time-expired labourers to shake free of the estate economy. They were required to carry passes, which showed their occupation and district and anyone found outside his district was liable to arrest and dispatched Immigration Depot. If he was found to be without employment he was deemed a vagrant.

Transportation to Suriname 

Transportation of Indian labour to Suriname began under an agreement that has been declared as Imperial. In return for Dutch rights to recruit Indian labour, the Dutch transferred some old forts (remnants of slave trade) in West Africa to the British and also bargained for an end to British claims in Sumatra. Labourers were signed up for five years and were provided with a return passage at the end of this term, but were to be subject to Dutch law. The first ship carrying Indian indentured labourers arrived in Suriname in June 1873 followed by six more ships during the same year.

British transportation of Indian labour, 1842 to 1870 

Following the abolition of slavery throughout the British Empire, it was again abolished in the French colonial empire in 1848, and the U.S. abolished slavery in 1865 with the 13th Amendment to the U.S. Constitution.

Between 1842 and 1870 a total of 525,482 Indians emigrated to the British and French Colonies. Of these, 351,401 went to Mauritius, 76,691 went to Demerara, 42,519 went to Trinidad, 15,169 went to Jamaica, 6,448 went to Natal, 15,005 went to Réunion and 16,341 went to the other French colonies. This figure does not include the 30,000 who went to Mauritius earlier, labourers who went to Ceylon or Malaya and illegal recruitment to the French colonies. Thus by 1870 the indenture system, transporting Indian labour to the colonies, was an established system of providing labour for European colonial plantations and when, in 1879, Fiji became a recipient of Indian labour it was this same system with a few minor modifications.

The Indenture Agreement 

The following is the indenture agreement of 1912:
Period of Service-Five Years from the Date of Arrival in the Colony.
Nature of labour-Work in connection with the Cultivation of the soil or the manufacture of the produce on any plantation.
Number of days on which the Emigrant is required to labour in each Week-Every day, excepting Sundays and authorized holidays.
Number of hours in every day during which he is required to labour without extra remuneration-Nine hours on each of five consecutive days in every week commencing with the Monday of each week, and five hours on the Saturday of each week.
Monthly or Daily Wages and Task-Work Rates-When employed at time-work every adult male Emigrant above the age of fifteen years will be paid not less than one shilling, which is at present equivalent to twelve annas and every adult female Emigrant above that age not less than nine pence, which is at present equivalent to nine annas, for every working day of nine hours; children below that age will receive wages proportionate to the amount of work done.
When employed at task or ticca-work every adult male Emigrant above the age of fifteen years will be paid not less than one shilling, and every adult female Emigrant above that age not less than nine pence for every task which shall be performed.
The law is that a man's task shall be as much as ordinary able-bodied adult male Emigrant can do in six hours’ steady work, and that a woman's task shall be three-fourths of a man's task. An employer is not bound to allot, nor is an Emigrant bound to perform more than one task in each day, but by mutual agreement such extra work may be allotted, performed and paid for.
Wages are paid weekly on the Saturday of each week.
Conditions as to return passage-Emigrants may return to India at their own expense after completing five years’ industrial residence in the Colony.
After ten years’ continuous residence every Emigrant who was above the age of twelve on introduction to the Colony and who during that period has completed an industrial residence of five years, shall be entitled to a free-return passage if he claims it within two years after the completion of the ten years’ continuous residence. If the Emigrant was under twelve years of age when he was introduced into the colony, he will be entitled to a free return passage if he claims it before he reaches 24 years of age and fulfills the other conditions as to residence. A child of an Emigrant born within the colony will be entitled to a free return passage until he reaches the age of twelve, and must be accompanied on the voyage by his parents or guardian.
Other Conditions-Emigrants will receive rations from their employers during the first six months after their arrival on the plantation according to the scale prescribed by the government of Fiji at a daily cost of four pence, which is at present equivalent to four annas, for each person of twelve years of age and upwards.
Every child between five and twelve years of age will receive approximately half rations free of cost, and every child, five years of age and under, nine chattacks of milk daily free of cost, during the first year after their arrival.
Suitable dwelling will be assigned to Emigrants under indenture free of rent and will be kept in good repair by the employers. When Emigrants under indenture are ill they will be provided with Hospital accommodation, Medical attendance, Medicines, Medical comforts and Food free of charge.
An Emigrant who has a wife still living is not allowed to marry another wife in the Colony unless his marriage with his first wife shall have been legally dissolved; but if he is married to more than one wife in his country he can take them all with him to the Colony and they will then be legally registered and acknowledged as his wives.

Final ban on indenture system
Gopal Kirshna Gokhale, a moderate Congress leader, tabled a bill in the Viceroy Legislative Council to end the export of indentured labour to Natal (present day South Africa) in February 1910. The bill passed unanimously and came to effect in July 1911. However, the British-led Indian indenture system for other colonies finally ended in 1917. According to The Economist, "When the Imperial Legislative Council finally ended indenture because of pressure from Indian nationalists and declining profitability, rather than from humanitarian concerns."

British transportation of Indian indentured labour by colony

Culture 
Indo-Caribbean writers have had a strong impact on the literature of the region. In Guyana Indo-Guyanese writers have had a strong impact on the literature of Guyana. Notable writers of Indian descent include Joseph Rahomon and Shana Yardan.

See also

 Coolie
 Surinaam Ghat
 Global Girmit Museum
 Ibis trilogy

References

Bibliography
 Sen, Sunanda. "Indentured Labour from India in the Age of Empire." Social Scientist 44.1/2 (2016): 35–74. online
 Tinker, H. A New System of Slavery: The Export of Indian Labour Overseas 1820-1920, Oxford University Press, London, 1974
 Lal, B.V. Girmitiyas: The Origins of the Fiji Indians, Fiji Institute of Applied Studies, Lautoka, Fiji, 2004
 Gaiutra Bahadur, Coolie Woman: The Odyssey of Indenture. The University of Chicago (2014) 
 de Verteuil, Anthony. 1989. Eight East Indian Immigrants: Gokool, Soodeen, Sookoo, Capildeo, Beccani, Ruknaddeen, Valiama, Bunsee 
 Autobiography of an Indian Indetured Labourer. Munshi Rahman Khan (1874-1972). Shipra Publications, Delhi, 2005. .

External links
Indian indentured labourers - The National Archives of the UK Government
 The genesis of the Indentured Labour Route of UNESCO, https://www.lemauricien.com/le-mauricien/the-story-of-the-international-indentured-labour-route-project-and-its-philosophy/400344/

Debt bondage
History of Trinidad and Tobago
History of the Colony of Jamaica
History of British Grenada
History of Fiji
History of Guyana
History of Mauritius
History of Malaysia
History of South Africa
Indentured servitude
Indian diaspora
Slavery in the British Empire
Social history of India
Pakistani diaspora
Indian domestic workers
Slavery in India

fr:Engagisme